Paul Windsor Davies (born 1969) is a British politician who currently serves as Member of the Senedd (MS) for Preseli Pembrokeshire, a position he has held since 2007 election. He gained the seat from Labour and was re-elected in May 2011, May 2016  and again in May 2021.

Davies served as Leader of the Welsh Conservatives and Leader of the Opposition in Wales from 27 June 2018 to 23 January 2021, having previously been Deputy Leader from 2011 to 2018 and Acting Leader in 2011 and 2018. He resigned as Welsh Conservative Leader after possible breaches of Welsh COVID-19 rules.

Background

Davies grew up in Pontsian. He attended Tregroes Primary School and Llandysul Grammar School, obtaining A levels at Newcastle Emlyn Comprehensive School. Davies now lives in Blaenffos, north Pembrokeshire.

Professional career
On leaving school in 1987 aged 18 Davies started working for Lloyds TSB as a bank clerk based in Haverfordwest. He remained with the bank until his election to the National Assembly in 2007, having risen to become a Business Manager.

Political career
In February 2000, Davies was adopted as the Conservative Party candidate in the Ceredigion by-election; he came in third place in the results having improved the Conservatives' vote. He then fought the seat in the 2001 general election. In the Senedd election of 2003, he fought Preseli Pembrokeshire where he increased the share of the vote from 23% to 30%, cutting the Labour Party's majority to 1,326.

Davies has also held office within the Conservative Party including chairman of Ceredigion Conservative Association and Deputy Chairman of Mid and West Wales Conservatives.

He was first elected to the Senedd in 2007. Until March 2009 he served as Shadow Minister for Culture, the Welsh Language and Sport. From March 2009 until the Senedd in 2011, Davies held the role of Shadow Minister for Education and the Welsh Language. After his re-election as Senedd Member for Preseli Pembrokeshire in May 2011, he briefly held the role of Interim Leader of the Welsh Conservative Senedd Group before being appointed as Deputy Leader of the Welsh Conservative Senedd Group, and Shadow Minister for Finance.

Davies was elected Leader of the Welsh Conservatives in September 2018. He resigned as Leader of the Welsh Conservatives and Leader of the Opposition on 23 January 2021, after he was involved in an incident with possible breaches of Welsh COVID-19 regulations in December 2020. In April 2022 Paul Davies was cleared of breaking the Senedd's code of conduct.

References

External links
Paul Davies MS: own website
Member Profile: Senedd website

1969 births
Living people
People from Pembrokeshire
Conservative Party members of the Senedd
Wales AMs 2007–2011
Wales AMs 2011–2016
Wales MSs 2016–2021
Wales MSs 2021–2026
Welsh-speaking politicians